Roman Lyubimov (born 6 January 1992) is a Russian professional ice hockey player who is currently under contract with HC Spartak Moscow of the Kontinental Hockey League (KHL).

Playing career
As a youth, Lyubimov played in the 2005 Quebec International Pee-Wee Hockey Tournament with a team from Moscow. He later played exclusively within the development program of HC CSKA Moscow from the age of 15. He played the first six seasons of his pro career for CSKA in the KHL. Undrafted, and following the 2015–16 season, he agreed to sign a one-year, entry-level contract with the Philadelphia Flyers on 11 July 2016.

In the ensuing 2016–17 season, Lyubimov remained with Flyers through training camp to make the opening night roster. As a depth forward for the Flyers, Lyubimov appeared in 47 games totaling 4 goals and 6 points. With his rights retained by the Flyers, Lyubimov opted to return to CSKA after his solitary season in North America by signing a three-year contract on July 3, 2017.

Prior to the 2018–19 season, Lyubimov was released from his contract with CSKA in order to sign a two-year deal with Metallurg Magnitogorsk on August 23, 2018. Following the conclusion of his contract with Metallurg, Lyubimov continued in the KHL by signing a one-year deal as a free agent with HC Spartak Moscow on 10 May 2020. In the following 2020–21 season, Lyubimov split the season between Spartak, registering 5 points in 25 games, and Ak Bars Kazan, featuring in 9 games for 2 assists.

Remaining with Ak Bars in the following pre-season, Lyubimov left the club by mutual consent prior to the 2021–22 season on 28 August 2021. He was later signed to a one-year deal with fellow KHL outfit, Amur Khabarovsk, registering 9 points through 30 regular season games.

As a free agent, Lyubimov returned to former club, Spartak Moscow, agreeing to a one-year contract on 4 May 2022.

Career statistics

Regular season and playoffs

International

Awards and honors

References

External links
 

1992 births
Living people
Ak Bars Kazan players
Amur Khabarovsk players
HC CSKA Moscow players
Metallurg Magnitogorsk players
HC Spartak Moscow players
Sportspeople from Tver
Philadelphia Flyers players
Russian ice hockey forwards
Undrafted National Hockey League players